Burnham railway station is a railway station serving Burnham, Buckinghamshire, England,  from  and situated between  to the east and  to the west. The station is in Haymill, a ward of western Slough, about half a mile to the south of Burnham proper. Originally in Buckinghamshire, the station transferred into the county of Berkshire when county boundaries were realigned in 1974. 

The station is served by local services operated by the Elizabeth line. The station is on the Great Western Main Line, the original line of the Great Western Railway.

History 
On opening on 1 July 1899, the station was named Burnham Beeches, becoming Burnham (Bucks) from 1 September 1930 to 5 May 1975, and then purely Burnham, although National Rail variously refers to the station as Burnham (Bucks) and Burnham (Berks). The station was closed as a First World War economy measure from 2 April 1917 to 3 March 1919.

In preparation for the introduction of Elizabeth line services, the operation of the station was transferred to TfL Rail (now the Elizabeth line) on behalf of Transport for London at the end of 2017.

Location
The station is situated about half a mile south of Burnham Village and around a mile north of the village of Cippenham and is the closest station to Slough Trading Estate.

Facilities
Burnham Railway Station has a fully staffed ticketing office which is open 7 days a week. There are three self-service ticket machines, two at the station entrance and one on the platform. The machines accept cash, debit and credit cards.

The station has a waiting room which is open during ticket office opening hours. Seating is also available under canopies on each platform.

Car parking facilities are around 100 metres away, in a car park operated by APCOA. Parking permits are sold to ticket holders individually from the station, or season ticket holders may purchase tickets from APCOA.

Services
Since November 2022, Burnham Station is served by Elizabeth line Class 345 trains towards Abbey Wood and Reading.

Burnham has an island platform – platform 1 has services to Reading and platform 2 has services to Abbey Wood. Service frequency is six TfL trains per hour in each direction during weekday peak times, four per hour at other times.

Unusually for a station on the Great Western Main Line, Burnham was built with platforms that serve only the relief lines, which makes it vulnerable to losing services when engineering work closes the relief lines and leaves trains only on the main lines. Consequently, the station is frequently served by a replacement bus service at night.

References

External links

Railway stations in Berkshire
Transport in Slough
Great Western Main Line
Former Great Western Railway stations
Railway stations in Great Britain opened in 1899
Railway stations in Great Britain closed in 1917
Railway stations in Great Britain opened in 1919
Railway stations served by the Elizabeth line
1899 establishments in England
Burnham, Buckinghamshire